This article lists German Postal Ministers. See also lists of incumbents.

State Secretaries for the Post, 1880–1918
Heinrich von Stephan 1880–1897
Viktor von Podbielski 1897–1901
Reinhold Kraetke 1901–1917
Otto Rüdlin 1917–1918

Ministers of Post, 1918–1945

West and East Germany, 1949–1997

Flags

Postal